Ferndale is a suburb of New Plymouth, in the western North Island of New Zealand. It is located to the south of the city centre.

Ferndale Hall was built in the 1960s after fundraising by the Ferndale Progressive Association.

Demographics

Ferndale had a population of 738 at the 2018 New Zealand census, an increase of 48 people (7.0%) since the 2013 census, and an increase of 69 people (10.3%) since the 2006 census. There were 264 households, comprising 369 males and 369 females, giving a sex ratio of 1.0 males per female. The median age was 37.7 years (compared with 37.4 years nationally), with 171 people (23.2%) aged under 15 years, 111 (15.0%) aged 15 to 29, 363 (49.2%) aged 30 to 64, and 90 (12.2%) aged 65 or older.

Ethnicities were 92.7% European/Pākehā, 11.0% Māori, 1.2% Pacific peoples, 3.7% Asian, and 2.8% other ethnicities. People may identify with more than one ethnicity.

The percentage of people born overseas was 16.7, compared with 27.1% nationally.

Although some people chose not to answer the census's question about religious affiliation, 53.7% had no religion, 37.0% were Christian, 0.4% had Māori religious beliefs, 0.4% were Buddhist and 2.0% had other religions.

Of those at least 15 years old, 144 (25.4%) people had a bachelor's or higher degree, and 78 (13.8%) people had no formal qualifications. The median income was $38,400, compared with $31,800 nationally. 132 people (23.3%) earned over $70,000 compared to 17.2% nationally. The employment status of those at least 15 was that 288 (50.8%) people were employed full-time, 105 (18.5%) were part-time, and 15 (2.6%) were unemployed.

References

Suburbs of New Plymouth